The 9th European Women's Artistic Gymnastics Championships were held in London, United Kingdom, in 1973.

Medalists

References 

1973
European Artistic Gymnastics Championships
1973 in European sport
International sports competitions in London
International gymnastics competitions hosted by the United Kingdom
1973 in English sport
1973 in women's gymnastics